Grutness is a small settlement and headland at the southern tip of the main island of the Shetland Islands, Scotland. The settlement is within the parish of Dunrossness. It is located close to Sumburgh Head, and is the terminus of the ferry service between the Shetland Mainland and Fair Isle. It has a pebbly beach and seals, whales and orcas can be seen in the sea nearby.

References

External links

Shetlopedia entry for Grutness

Villages in Mainland, Shetland